Ewen Adair Whitaker (22 June 1922 – 11 October 2016) was a British-born astronomer who specialized in lunar studies. During World War II he was engaged in quality control for the lead sheathing of hollow cables strung under the English Channel as part of the "Pipe Line Under The Ocean" Project (PLUTO) to supply gasoline to Allied military vehicles in France. After the war, he obtained a position at the Royal Greenwich Observatory working on the UV spectra of stars, but became interested in lunar studies. As a sideline, Whitaker drew and published the first accurate chart of the South Polar area of the Moon in 1954, and served as director of the Lunar Section of the British Astronomical Association.

After meeting Dr. Gerard P. Kuiper, Director of Yerkes Observatory in Wisconsin, USA, at an International Astronomical Union meeting in Dublin in 1955, he was invited to join Kuiper's fledgling Lunar Project at Yerkes to work on producing a high-quality photographic atlas of the Moon. The dawn of the Space Age with the launch of the Russian Sputnik 1 soon put the Lunar Project in NASA's limelight.

In 1960, Whitaker followed Kuiper to the University of Arizona where the small Lunar Project evolved into the Lunar and Planetary Laboratory (LPL) with over 300 scientists, technicians, and supporting staff. The resulting Photographic Lunar Atlas, Orthographic Atlas of the Moon (giving accurate positions on the lunar surface), and the Rectified Lunar Atlas (giving astronaut-eye views of the whole lunar nearside) proved to be invaluable for the planning and operational stages of later spacecraft missions to the Moon. Whitaker was involved with several NASA missions, including successfully locating the landing site of Surveyor 3. This was used to set the landing site for the Apollo 12 mission whose astronauts visited the Surveyor lander.

Whitaker was considered by some to be the world's leading expert on lunar mapping and nomenclature . He was active in the IAU's Task Group for Lunar Nomenclature, and in 1999 he published a book on the history of lunar mapping and nomenclature, titled "Mapping and Naming the Moon."

Whitaker retired from the LPL in 1978, becoming research scientist emeritus. He remained in Tucson, Arizona, until his death on 11 October 2016; his wife, Beryl, had died in 2013. Ewen Whitaker's papers are held at the University of Arizona Special Collections Library.

NASA teams
Co-investigator with G. P. Kuiper, H. Urey, G. Shoemaker, and R. Heacock, on Lunar Ranger Project; chose impact points for Rangers 6 and 7, the latter being the first spacecraft to obtain closeups of the Moon's surface.
Member of Lunar Surveyor TV Investigator Team; located landed positions of four Surveyors, including Surveyor 3, which was chosen as the landing site for the Apollo 12 astronauts.
Member of Lunar Orbiter 5 Scientific Site Selection Team; chose four of the final list of sites.
Member of Apollo Orbital Science Photo Team; briefed orbiting astronauts and their backups for Missions 13, 15, and 16.

Other achievements
First to apply the Zwicky technique of differential UV/Red photography to the Moon, which maps areas of differing chemical composition of the lunar surface. His results were used in Apollo site choices.
Discovery and approximate determination of the orbital eccentricity and inclination of Miranda, Uranus's fifth satellite, made possible by a simple plate-measuring method that he devised and which gave a tenfold increase in precision (from plates taken decades earlier).
With colleague D. W. Arthur, added about 60 new names to anonymous craters near the limb of the Moon that had been brought into prominence in the Rectified Atlas; the names were adopted internationally. He also chose 14 favorably located farside craters to commemorate the Challenger and Columbia astronauts who lost their lives in the two disasters; these were also adopted internationally over competing suggestions.
Determined with considerable confidence the dates on which Galileo made his drawings of the Moon, and composed the various relevant sections of his Sidereus Nuncius.
Devised a logical lettering system for designating unnamed craters on the Moon's farside; this was adopted unanimously for universal use by the IAU in 2006, as was the corrected list of letters for nearside craters which L. E. Anderson and he compiled in 1982.
Long after his retirement, made contributions to the history of the telescope, constructing an instrument built to a 16th-century design attributed to Leonard Digges capable of producing magnified wide-field images.

Works
Over 130 atlases, reports, papers, articles, reviews, chapters for books, letters, etc. A selection of the more important given below.

Photographic Lunar Atlas, ed. G. P. Kuiper, with 3 others (1960)
Orthographic Atlas of the Moon, ed. G. P. Kuiper with 1 other (1960/61)
Rectified Lunar Atlas, with 3 others (1963)
Consolidated Lunar Atlas, with 4 others (1967)
Location of the Surveyor Spacecraft (1968)
An Investigation of the Lunar Heiligenschein (1969)
Mare Imbrium Lava Flows and their Relationship to Color Boundaries (1972)
Artificial Lunar Impact Craters; 4 New Identifications (1972)
Eccentricity and Inclination of Miranda's orbit, with 1 other (1973)
Populations of Impacting Bodies in the Inner Solar System, with 1 other (1976)
Galileo's Lunar Observations and the dating of the composition of "Siderius Nuncius" (1978)
The Lunar Procellarum Basin (1981)
NASA Catalogue of Lunar Nomenclature, with 1 other (1982)
The University of Arizona's Lunar and Planetary Laboratory; its Founding and Early Years (1986)
Selenography in the 17th Century (1989)
Mapping and Naming the Moon (242 page book) (1999)
Mare Orientale; The Eastern Sea in the West (2007)
The Digges-Bourne Telescope Revisited (2007)
Representations and Maps of the Moon—The First Two Centuries (2009)

Other recognition
Personal letter of commendation from President Nixon in 1969 for finding landed position of Surveyor 3, enabling the Apollo 12 astronauts to land nearby and retrieve parts for laboratory examination.
Walter Goodacre Medal recipient and Prize from British Astronomical Association in 1982 for contributions to knowledge of the moon.
Asteroid 7948 (1992HY) named "Whitaker" in 2000.
Asked by Director of Instituto e Museo di Storia della Scienza in Florence to write a 4,500-word illustrated article in 2008 on the history of Moon observation and mapping from Leonardo da Vinci to 1800, along with an update to his 1978 paper on dating Galileo's Moon drawings, to accompany those original drawings from 1609. These were included in a major exhibition in 2009 in the Palazzo Strozzi.

Sources of above information:-
 Lunar and Planetary Laboratory, University of Arizona (Curriculum Vitae and Publications list for E. A. Whitaker)
 Who's Who in America" 2010 Edition
 The subject himself. The introductory section was completely re-written by Mr. Whitaker, and entered by a friend and temporary house guest of the Whitakers, on 29 May 2010. A few minor updates were added in 2014.

Bibliography
 
 
 G.L. Gutschewski, D.C. Kinsler & E.A. Whitaker, "Atlas and Gazetteer of the Near Side of the Moon", NASA SP-241.
 Gerald P Kuiper, Ewen A Whitaker, Robert G Strom, John W Fountain, and Stephen M Larson, "Consolidated Lunar Atlas", Lunar and Planetary Institute, 2005.
 David Clow & Ewen A. Whitaker, "A Pinpoint on the Ocean of Storms: Finding the Target for Apollo 12." QUEST - The History of Spaceflight Quarterly. Vol. 10 No. 4, Fall 2003.

References

1922 births
2016 deaths
20th-century American astronomers
20th-century British astronomers
Planetary scientists
University of Arizona faculty
People from Tucson, Arizona
British emigrants to the United States